Red rose may refer to:

Culture
 Rose (symbolism) $ Socialism and social democracy, an anti-authoritarian, socialist and social democratic symbol
 The Rose Cross, a symbol of Rosicrucianism often features a red rose

Places
 Red Roses, Welsh village
 Red Rose, Manitoba, a designated place in the Canadian province of Manitoba

Plants
 Red Rose of Lancaster, county flower of Lancashire
 Rosa gallica
 Rose, the flower

Film and television
 Red Rose (1980 film), a Hindi film starring Rajesh Khanna
 Red Rose (2014 film), a French-Iranian film
 The Red Rose (1951 film), a French comedy film
 The Red Rose (1960 film), a Spanish film
 Red Roses (film), a 1940 Italian comedy film
 "Red Rose" (Sons of Anarchy), a television episode
 Red Rose (TV series), a British horror series

Music
 Red Rose (album), a 2000 album by Elva Hsiao
 "Red Rose" (song), a 1987 song by Alphaville
 "Red Roses" (song), a song by Lil Skies
 "Red Rose", a song by The Gaylads

Other uses
 Red Rose Tea, a beverage
 Red Rose (missile)
 The Red Roses, the nickname of the England national women's rugby union team
 Red Rose, emblem of both the men's and women's English rugby union teams
 Red Rose, emblem of Lancashire County Cricket Club.

See also
 Black Rose (disambiguation)
 Red Rose Radio, the former name of a radio station in Preston, Lancashire, England
 Rose (disambiguation)
 Rose Red (disambiguation)